Aleksandr Yuryevich Olshansky (born 19 January 1946, Saratov) is a Soviet and Russian mathematician, Doctor of Physical and Mathematical Sciences (1979), laureate of the Maltsev Prize, a professor of mathematics at Vanderbilt University (since 1999). In 1983 he was an Invited Speaker at the International Congress of Mathematicians in Warsaw. He is a specialist in the field of combinatorial and geometric group theory, and also has several papers on Lie algebras and associative algebras. He is an honorary member of the American Mathematical Society.

References

External links
 Александр Юрьевич Ольшанский on halgebra.math.msu.su
 Александр Юрьевич Ольшанский on istina.msu.ru

1946 births
Scientists from Saratov
Moscow State University alumni
Soviet mathematicians
Russian mathematicians
Academic staff of Moscow State University
Vanderbilt University faculty
Fellows of the American Mathematical Society
Living people